Speak of the Devil is an album by jazz guitarist John Abercrombie with organist Dan Wall and drummer Adam Nussbaum that was recorded in 1993 and released by ECM in 1994.

Reception
The Allmusic review by Michael G. Nastos gave the album 2½ stars, stating, "Though While We're Young was a definitive recording for Abercrombie's vaunted trio, this CD simply offers a different slant. It's the sign of a group either in transition of evolution, and whatever the case, it's an intriguing step for these three uncanny sonic explorers". The Penguin Guide to Jazz gave the album 3 stars, stating, "It must have been fun to play, but there is too little for the listener to get a purchase on".

Track listing
All compositions by John Abercrombie except were indicated

 "Angel Food" (Wall) – 7:55
 "Now and Again" (Abercrombie, Nussbaum, Wall) – 6:16
 "Mahat" (Abercrombie, Nussbaum, Wall) – 8:27
 "Chorale" – 8:21
 "Farewell" – 6:16
 "BT–U" (Nussbaum) – 6:22
 "Early to Bed" – 8:20
 "Dreamland" (Wall) – 9:12
 "Hell's Gate" (Wall) – 7:07

Personnel
 John Abercrombie – guitar
 Dan Wall – Hammond organ
 Adam Nussbaum – drums

References

ECM Records albums
John Abercrombie (guitarist) albums
1994 albums
Albums produced by Manfred Eicher